Andō, Ando, Andou or Andoh (written: 安藤 or 安東) is a Japanese surname. Notable people with the surname include:

, Japanese gravure idol and professional wrestler
, Japanese footballer
Albert Ando (1929–2002), Japanese-born American economist
, Japanese daimyō
, Japanese voice actress
, Japanese alpine skier
, Japanese actress
, Japanese screenwriter and film director
, Japanese manga artist
Ando Jubei, cloisonné artist
, Japanese footballer
, Japanese writer and television personality
, Japanese freestyle skier
, Japanese weightlifter
, Japanese general and wartime Home Minister
, Japanese daimyō
, Japanese businessman
, Japanese Kendo teacher
, Japanese women's footballer
, Japanese businessman, former president of Sony
, Japanese baseball player
, Japanese footballer
, Japanese composer and guitarist
, Japanese actor and film director
, Japanese animator and character designer
, Japanese sport wrestler
, Japanese figure skater
, Japanese weightlifter
, Japanese table tennis player
, Japanese softball player
Miya Ando, American artist
, Japanese inventor and founder of Nissin Foods
, Japanese film director
, Japanese samurai
, Japanese baseball player
, Japanese footballer
, Japanese comedian
, Japanese manga artist
, Japanese actor and former yakuza
, Japanese daimyō
, Imperial Japanese general and Governor-General of Taiwan
, Japanese actress
, Japanese idol
, Japanese gravure idol and model
, Japanese basketball player
, Japanese baseball player
, Japanese baseball player
, Japanese philosopher
, Japanese footballer
, Japanese footballer
Shuto Ando (born 1994) Japanese basketball player
, Japanese politician
, Japanese architect
, Japanese rugby union player
, Japanese Go player
, Japanese slalom canoeist
, also known as Andō Sadayoshi, Imperial Japanese general and Governor-General of Taiwan
, Japanese footballer
, Japanese Go player
Tsuneo Ando (born 1956), Japanese aikidoka
, Japanese Ainu singer and musician
, Japanese cyclist
, Japanese long-distance runner
, Japanese news anchor
, Japanese singer-songwriter
, Japanese baseball player

Other people
Antonio Ando, Argentine sport shooter
Clifford Ando (born 1969), American classicist

Fictional characters
Ando Masahashi, a character from the television series Heroes
Mahoro Andou (安藤 まほろ), assumed name of the title character in the manga and anime series Mahoromatic
Ringo Andou (あんどうりんご), a main character from the video game series Puyo Puyo
Ruruka Ando, a character from Danganronpa
, a character in the manga series Gakuen Alice
Tazusa Andou (安藤 鶴紗), a character from the anime series Assault Lily

See also
Andō clan, a Japanese samurai clan

Japanese-language surnames